Bugloss is a name (from Greek βούγλωσσον, boúglōsson, "ox-tongue") used for several plants in the borage family (Boraginaceae):

Barrelier's bugloss (Anchusa barrelieri)
Bugloss or small bugloss (Anchusa arvensis)
Bugloss fiddleneck (Amsinckia lycopsoides)
Common bugloss (Anchusa officinalis)
Cretan viper's bugloss (Echium creticum)
Dyers' bugloss (Alcanna tinctoria)
Giant viper's bugloss (Echium pininana)
Italian Bugloss (Anchusa azurea)
Mount Teide bugloss (Echium wildpretii)
Purple viper's bugloss (Echium plantagineum) 
Siberian bugloss (Brunnera macrophylla)
Strigose bugloss (Anchusa strigosa)
Viper's bugloss (Echium vulgare) 

Bugloss is part of the name of an insect:
The viper's bugloss (Hadena irregularis), a noctuid moth in the tribe Hadenini, whose caterpillar feeds on viper's bugloss and related plants

Bugloss may also be:
Bugloss (French: Buglosse), the 28th day of the month of Floréal in the French Republican calendar
Viper and Bugloss, characters created by columnist Peter Simple: see List of Peter Simple's characters
, a Flower-class corvette of the British Royal Navy